Gary Wigham (born 27 May 1961) is a former English cricketer.  Wigham was a left-handed batsman who bowled right-arm off break.  He was born in Seaham, County Durham.

Wigham played Minor counties cricket for Durham in 1991, making a single appearance in the Minor Counties Championship against Hertfordshire.  Durham were granted first-class status at the end of the 1991 season.  Unlike many players, Wigham was retained by the county, but went on to make just a single List A appearance against Essex in the Sunday League.  He didn't bat in this match, but with the ball he took the wicket of John Stephenson for the cost of 43 runs from 8 overs.

References

External links
Gary Wigham at ESPNcricinfo
Gary Wigham at CricketArchive

1973 births
Living people
Sportspeople from Bishop Auckland
Cricketers from County Durham
English cricketers
Durham cricketers